Aizier is a commune in the Eure department in Normandy in northern France.

Population

See also
Communes of the Eure department

References

External links

 Website of the Commune Aizier
 Communauté de communes Roumois Seine

Communes of Eure